Diego Ibáñez Cotroneo (born 25 January 1989) is a Chilean politician. He graduated from Laws without completing his Bachelor of Arts. He is currently a Member of the Chamber of Deputies of Chile for the electoral district No. 6, corresponding to the Valparaíso Region.

As a student of the Law School of the Pontifical Catholic University of Valparaíso, he was vice-president of the Student Federation for the period 2013-2014. He is a member of the Convergencia Social political party.

References

External links
 BCN Profile
 

1989 births
Living people
Pontifical Catholic University of Valparaíso alumni
21st-century Chilean politicians
Members of the Autonomist Movement
Social Convergence politicians
People from Punta Arenas